The 1966 Marshall Thundering Herd football team was an American football team that represented Marshall University in the Mid-American Conference (MAC) during the 1966 NCAA University Division football season. In its eighth season under head coach Charlie Snyder, the team compiled a 2–8 record (1–5 against conference opponents), tied for last place in the MAC, and was outscored by a total of 210 to 119. Andy Socha and Dennis Miller were the team captains. The team played its home games at Fairfield Stadium in Huntington, West Virginia.

Schedule

References

Marshall
Marshall Thundering Herd football seasons
Marshall Thundering Herd football